The Whippany Burying Yard, in the Whippany section of Hanover Township, Morris County, New Jersey, United States, is a cemetery that was added to the National Register of Historic Places on December 11, 2009.

The two plus acre burying yard, which has approximately 450 graves and which dates back to 1718, is the oldest cemetery in northwest New Jersey. Graves include those of veterans of the French and Indian War, the American Revolution, the Civil War, and World War I.

See also 
 National Register of Historic Places listings in Morris County, New Jersey

References 

Cemeteries in Morris County, New Jersey
Cemeteries on the National Register of Historic Places in New Jersey
Hanover Township, New Jersey
National Register of Historic Places in Morris County, New Jersey
1718 establishments in New Jersey
New Jersey Register of Historic Places